STIR Sportive de Zarzouna, is a Tunisian football club, based in the Zarzouna district in the city of Bizerte in northern Tunisia. Founded in 1965, the team plays in Yellow, blue and white colors. Their ground is Stade de Zarzouna, which has a capacity of 6,000.

Football clubs in Tunisia
Association football clubs established in 1961
1961 establishments in Tunisia
Bizerte
Sports clubs in Tunisia